Dauda Akanmu Epo-Akara (23 June 1943 – August 2005), a Yoruba musician from the historical city of Ibadan, was the main force behind the popular Yoruba music genre called were music.

References
 Biography of Dauda Epo-Akara

Yoruba musicians
1943 births
2005 deaths
Musicians from Ibadan
20th-century Nigerian male singers